Several universities throughout North America and Oceania use mobile wallets such as Google Wallet for Android and Apple Wallet for iOS and watchOS to store mobile credentials. Some, such as the University of Alabama, have even replaced physical cards entirely with digital IDs. The following is a list of schools that use mobile credentials, and for what mobile wallets they are available.

List 
Available through Transact eAccounts, CBORD GET Mobile, or the respective school's app on the Google Play Store or Apple App Store, depending on the university's provider and implementation.

References 

Digital currencies
Payment systems
Mobile payments